Dinesh Sarangi is an Indian politician. He was member of the Bharatiya Janata Party. Sarangi was a member of the Jharkhand Legislative Assembly from the Baharagora constituency in East Singhbhum district. Sarangi was State Health Minister between 2000 and 2005.

References 

People from East Singhbhum district
Bharatiya Janata Party politicians from Jharkhand
Members of the Jharkhand Legislative Assembly
Living people
21st-century Indian politicians
Year of birth missing (living people)